Abel Smith (baptised 14 March 1717 – 12 July 1788) of Wilford House in the parish of Wilford, near Nottingham, England, was one of the leading bankers of his time and served thrice as a Member of Parliament.

Some secondary sources refer to him as Abel Smith II in order to distinguish him from other members of his family with the same name.

Origins 
He was baptised on 14 March 1717 at Nottingham, the third son and successor of Abel Smith (died 1756), a banker of Nottingham, the second son and heir of Thomas Smith (1631–1699), a mercer at Nottingham who in 1658 founded Smith's Bank. His mother was Jane Beaumont (1689–1743), a daughter of George Beaumont of Chapelthorpe in Yorkshire.

Career 
He was apprenticed at the age of fifteen to William Wilberforce, a merchant adventurer from Hull (grandfather of William Wilberforce the slavery abolitionist) and became a partner in the firm of Wilberforce and Smith, eventually becoming managing partner, whilst at the same time continuing an involvement with his father's bank at Nottingham. On the death of his father in 1699 he succeeded as a partner to Smith's Bank, together with his eldest brother Sir George Smith, 1st Baronet (1713-1769) "of East Stoke in the County of Nottingham" (created a baronet in 1757), and in 1700 he assumed sole control. In 1758 he founded a bank in London, Smith & Payne, and two other provincial banks, at Lincoln in 1775 and Hull in 1784, both separately constituted.

In 1774 he was elected as a Member of Parliament for Aldborough in Suffolk, a pocket borough controlled by Henry Pelham-Clinton, 2nd Duke of Newcastle-under-Lyne (1720–1794), a close associate. He later successively represented St Ives in Cornwall (a seat controlled by Humphrey Mackworth Praed) and St Germans in Cornwall, controlled by Edward Eliot family, on the advice of Pitt. Later a proportion of the family wealth was devoted to buying the Smiths a couple of pocket boroughs of their own, and by the early 19th century his son, Robert Smith, 1st Baron Carrington, could nominate MPs at both Midhurst and Wendover.

He seems to have become an MP as much with the business advantages in mind as with any high political ambitions. Brooke quotes him as writing, shortly before he was first elected in 1774, "I see many solid advantages accruing to my family from a seat in Parliament, the best of which, the article of franking [the right to free postage, valuable in those days of heavy postal rates], will save a very considerable expense in so extensive a business as that I am engaged in." Although he supported the government, his first two speeches in the House of Commons were both attacks on the government for the way in which they had allotted subscriptions for government loans, in each case referring to occasions when his own firm had been excluded.

Marriage and issue
In 1745 he married Mary Bird (1724–1780), a daughter of Thomas Bird (died 1746) (son of William Bird (died 1731)) of Coventry by his wife Elizabeth Martyn (1699–1758), a daughter of Francis Martyn (1637–1713) and Elizabeth Doughty (1665–1748). His wife's younger sister, Elizabeth Bird, was the mother of the slavery abolitionist William Wilberforce.

By his wife he had nine children, of whom five sons followed him into Parliament:
 Thomas Smith (1746–1769)
 Abel Smith (1748–1779), MP for Nottingham
 Robert Smith, 1st Baron Carrington (1752–1838), MP for Nottingham, raised to the peerage in 1796
 Samuel Smith (1754–1834) of Woodhall Park, MP for Leicester, Malmesbury, Midhurst, St Germans and Wendover
 William Smith (born 1756)
 George Smith (1765–1836), MP for Lostwithiel, Midhurst and Wendover
 John Smith (1767–1842) of Blendon Hall, MP for Nottingham, Wendover, Midhurst and Buckinghamshire
 Lucy Smith (c1760–1835)
 Elizabeth Smith (died 1789), married William Manning, MP

The historian Lewis Namier has said that between 1770 and 1910 at least 24 of Smith's descendants had served in the Commons with a combined term of 364 years.

Death and burial
He died at Wilford on 12 July 1788, aged seventy-one, and was buried in St. Peter's Church, Nottingham.

See also
Smith's Bank

References

Sources
 John Brooke, The House of Commons 1754–1790: Introductory Survey (Oxford: Oxford University Press, 1968, reprinted from Volume I of Namier & Brooke, The History of Parliament: The House of Commons 1754–1790, London: HMSO, 1964).
 Abel Smith Last Will and Testament, 12 November 1785. Public Record Office catalogue Reference: Prob 11/1168.

1717 births
1788 deaths
British bankers
British MPs 1774–1780
British MPs 1780–1784
British MPs 1784–1790
Members of the Parliament of Great Britain for St Ives
Abel
Members of the Parliament of Great Britain for St Germans